The 2006–07 All-Ireland Senior Club Football Championship was the 37th staging of the All-Ireland Senior Club Football Championship since its establishment by the Gaelic Athletic Association in 1970-71. The championship began on 15 October 2006 and ended on 1 April 2007.

Salthill-Knocknacarra were the defending champions, however, they failed to qualify after being beaten by Corofin in the second round of the 2006 Galway County Championship.

On 1 April 2007, Crossmaglen Rangers won the championship following a 0-13 to 1-05 defeat of Dr. Crokes in the All-Ireland final replay at O'Moore Park. It was their fourth championship title overall and their first title since 2000.

Colm Cooper of the Dr. Crokes club was the championship's top scorer with 6-23.

Team changes

There were no representatives from the Kilkenny County Championship for the first time ever, as the Kilkenny County Board decided to regrade  and enter their championship-winning team (Erin's Own) into the Leinster Intermediate Club Football Championship.

Results

Connacht Senior Club Football Championship

Quarter-final

Semi-finals

Final

Leinster Senior Club Football Championship

First round

Quarter-finals

Semi-finals

Final

Munster Senior Club Football Championship

Quarter-finals

Semi-finals

Final

Ulster Senior Club Football Championship

Preliminary round

Quarter-finals

Semi-finals

Final

All-Ireland Senior Club Football Championship

Quarter-final

Semi-finals

Finals

Championship statistics

Top scorers

Overall

In a single game

Miscellaneous

 Moorefield won the Leinster Club Championship for the first time in their history.
 St. Brigid's won the Connacht Club Championship title for the first time in their history.

References

All-Ireland Senior Club Football Championship
All-Ireland Senior Club Football Championship
All-Ireland Senior Club Football Championship